Fatso was a band from the 1970s, who featured regular in the TV series Rutland Weekend Television. Their involvement with this show spawned The Rutles, which Innes and Halsey portrayed in one episode.

Members included:-

 Neil Innes
 John Halsey
 Billy Bremner
 Brian Hodgson
 Roger Rettig

2008 reunion 

Fatso planned to get back together for  a tour of the UK in October 2008

References 

British comedy musical groups